Privatbrauerei Wittingen GmbH ("Wittingen Private Brewery") is a German brewing firm based in the Lower Saxon town of Wittingen. In 2013, the brewery had 104 employees and produced 432,550 hl of beer.

According to the firm's statements it has been a family business since 1429, and is therefore one of the oldest private breweries in Germany. It delivers to customers in North Germany within a radius of 150 km. In addition, there is a division that dispatches beer throughout Germany.

At the creditors' meeting of another brewery, the Herrenhäuser Brewery, on 20 October 2010 it was agreed that it could be purchased by Privatbrauerei Wittingen.

Brands 
Currently the firm offers the following types of beer:
Wittinger Premium
Wittinger Pilsner
Wittinger Doppelbock
Wittinger Weizen
Wittinger Landbier
Stackmann's Dunkel
Stackmann's Alster
1429 - Das Original

References

External links 

Homepage of the firm 

Beer in Germany
Beer brands of Germany
Wittingen